The 2013 AFL season was the 22nd season in the Australian Football League contested by the Adelaide Crows.

Season summary

Pre-season matches
2013 NAB Cup

Ladder

Home and away season

Ladder

References

Adelaide Football Club seasons
2013 Australian Football League season